Ali Sait Akbaytogan, also known as Ali Said Pasha (1872; Manyas – 20 March 1950; Ankara) was an officer of the Ottoman Army and a general of the Turkish Army.

See also
List of high-ranking commanders of the Turkish War of Independence
List of Commanders of the First Army of Turkey

Sources

External links

1872 births
1950 deaths
People from Manyas
People from Hüdavendigâr vilayet
Turkish people of Circassian descent
Republican People's Party (Turkey) politicians
Deputies of Kocaeli
Ottoman Army generals
Turkish Army generals
Ottoman military personnel of the Italo-Turkish War
Ottoman military personnel of the Balkan Wars
Ottoman military personnel of World War I
Ottoman prisoners of war
World War I prisoners of war held by the United Kingdom
Malta exiles
Commanders of the First Army of Turkey
Turkish military personnel of the Greco-Turkish War (1919–1922)
Ottoman Military Academy alumni
Ottoman Military College alumni
Recipients of the Medal of Independence with Red Ribbon (Turkey)